Ambalapuzha North is a panchayat and part of Ambalapuzha. It is in Alappuzha district, Kerala, India.

References 

Places in Alappuzha district